Lutjaninae is a subfamily of marine ray-finned fishes, one of four subfamilies classified within the family Lutjanidae, the snappers.

Genera
The subfamily Lutjaninae  contains  6 genera and 76 species:

 genus Hoplopagrus Gill, 1861
 genus Lutjanus Bloch, 1790
 genus Macolor Bleeker, 1860
 genus Ocyurus Gill, 1862
 genus Pinjalo Bleeker, 1873
 genus Rhomboplites Gill, 1862

A taxonomic study of snappers within the subfamily Lutjaninae in the tropical western Atlantic Ocean indicated that the monotypic genera Ocyurus and Rhomboplites sit within the genus Lutjanus.

Fossil history
The Lutjaninae are represented in the fossil record as far back as the 48.6 million years ago from the Eocene where specimens have been found in the United Kingdom and Louisiana. More recent specimens are known from the Miocene in Mexico and Florida and the Quaternary of the Turks and Caicos Islands.

References

Lutjanidae
Ray-finned fish subfamilies